Ndevana is a settlement situated east of King William's Town. It falls under Buffalo City Metropolitan Municipality in the Eastern Cape province of South Africa.

References

Populated places in Buffalo City Metropolitan Municipality